The following is a list of Malayalam films released in the year 1995.

Dubbed films

References

 1995
1995
Malayalam
 Mal
1995 in Indian cinema